Antonio Busca (Milan, 17 February 1767 – Milan, 19 May 1834) was an Italian nobleman and Lieutenant of the Sovereign Military Order of Malta from 1821 to 1834.

Life
Descended from the painter Antonio Busca, he belonged to a noble Milanese family.  He officially entered the Order of Malta on 11 March 1779.

On 11 June 1820 Busca was unanimously elected Lieutenant of the Order by its Council; before the election three members of the Council had left because of their opposition to Busca's nomination.  The Lieutenant was the head of the Order in the absence of a Grand Master (who would not be elected until 1879). In June 1821 Busca visited the Order's headquarters, the Convent, in Catania, Sicily. He was sworn in as Lieutenant and remained there two months before returning to Milan.

Like Andrea Di Giovanni y Centellés, his predecessor as Lieutenant, Busca unsuccessfully protested against the confiscation of Malta from the Order and Britain's continued rule of the island. In 1822 he organised a volunteer contingent of knights from the Order to assist against the Ottoman Empire in the Greek War of Independence, reviving the Order's crusader ideals. The Order's administration was then based in Catania, too far from the centres of European power and exposed to foreign incursions, so in 1826 Busca moved it to Ferrara, then within the Papal States. He was succeeded as Lieutenant on his death by Carlo Candida.

Notes

Sources
 Francesco Giuseppe Terrinoni Memorie storiche della resa di Malta ai francesi nel 1798, tip. delle Belle Arti, Roma, 1867.

1767 births
1834 deaths
Nobility from Milan
Lieutenants of the Sovereign Military Order of Malta
Military personnel from Milan